Ekaterina Barkalova (born 5 June 1995) is a Russian handballer who plays for Kuban.

Individual awards  
 Russian Super League Top Scorer: 2017

References

1995 births
Living people
People from Kropotkin, Krasnodar Krai
Russian female handball players
Sportspeople from Krasnodar Krai